Orhan Dragaš is a Serbian expert on security and international relations. He is the founder and director of the International Security Institute, based in Belgrade. He is the author of numerous expert articles, newspaper columns, as well as the books The Modern Intelligence-Security Community, Utopia or Reality and Two Faces of Globalization - Truth and Deceptions.

Biography and education 
Orhan Dragaš was born in Prizren, Serbia. He finished elementary school in Dragaš, Serbia, high school for electrical engineering in Prizren and college (graduate technologist) in Belgrade. He received his PhD in 2012 from the European University of Brussels on "Modern National Security Systems and the Intelligence and Security Community". He continued his post-doctoral studies  at the London School of Economics and Political Sciences (LSE), course “Business, International Relations and the Political Economy” (2018), Yale University (Yale School of Management), “Accelerated Management Programme” (2019), as well as at Oxford University's "Executive Leadership Programme" (2020). He is married to Nena, with whom he has four children, a daughter Angela, and sons Luka, Andreja and Stefan.

Research work 
Orhan Dragaš is the founder of the International Security Institute, based in Belgrade. This expert, non-governmental organization brings together experts in the fields of law, security, diplomacy, economics, communications and cooperates with numerous governmental and expert organizations in Serbia, the Balkans and Southeast Europe. He is involved in research and consulting in the fields of politics, security and international integration, especially the EU and NATO.

In early 2005, he founded the Faculty of Diplomacy and Security, the first of such profile in Eastern Europe. As lecturers, at the Academy have worked the most influential professors, scientists and researchers from Serbia and the countries of the region.

Political and social activism 
Orhan Dragaš was actively involved in the fight against the regime of then President of Serbia Slobodan Milošević in the 1990s. He was a prominent member of the largest opposition party The Serbian Renewal Movement, as well as its youth vice-president (SPO Youth Club). During that time he organized and led numerous actions and campaigns aimed at promoting human rights, reconciliation in the Balkans region and against war. He also actively participated in the implementation of numerous international projects on the democratization of Serbia and the Balkans and the promotion of civil liberties and integration into the EU and NATO.

Books 
Orhan Dragaš in 2009, published a book, "The Modern  Intelligence-Security Community, Utopia or Reality",  which in 2018 had a second, revised and amended edition and serves as the literature for teaching international relations and security at universities in Serbia and Eastern Europe.

In June 2019, he published the book “Two Faces of Globalization - Truth and Deceptions”, which had in the fall of the same year a second, supplemented edition, as well as edition in English, for the territory of Serbia. This study deals with the state of globalization and its aftermath ten years after the global crisis of 2008. The author of the foreword  for the second edition, as well as the English edition, is Tamas David-Barrett, a professor at Oxford University, with reviewers Steve H. Hanke, Martin Wolf, Emre Alkin, Neil Dooley, Daniel Lacalle, Jonathan Grant (King's College), Zhang Jiadong.

References 

1974 births
Living people
Serbian writers
Alumni of the London School of Economics